Maximilien Joseph Caspar Marie Kolkman  (9 March 1853, Dordrecht - 19 February 1924, The Hague) was a Dutch politician.

See also
List of Dutch politicians

1853 births
1924 deaths
Members of the House of Representatives (Netherlands)
Ministers of Finance of the Netherlands
People from Dordrecht
Commanders of the Order of the Netherlands Lion